is a professional Japanese baseball player. He plays pitcher for the Saitama Seibu Lions.

External links

 NPB.com

1989 births
Living people
Baseball people from Hokkaido
Japanese baseball players
Nippon Professional Baseball pitchers
Saitama Seibu Lions players